Remedios Gomez-Paraiso (1919 – May 15, 2014), known primarily as Kumander Liwayway, was a commander for the Huk Rebellion.

Early life 
Kumander Liwayway was the daughter of Basilio Gomez, the mayor of Anao, a provincial town in Pampanga, Philippines. As a teenager, she was interested in making dresses and perfume, and often participated in local beauty pageants. In 1941, during World War II, Japan invaded the Philippines. Her father organized resistance against them, for which the Japanese tortured and executed him. His corpse was displayed for everyone to see. Her father's death inspired her to leave home to join the guerrilla forces against Japan.

Guerilla 
Remedios and her brother Oscar were recruited by the Hukbalahap, a guerrilla movement near mount Arayat. The guerrilla forces gave Kumander Liwayway her name, meaning "Commander Dawn". She chose to join “rather than die without putting up resistance.” She quickly moved up through the ranks of the military receiving both combat training and Marxist education.

Liwayway was known for dressing formally and wearing red lipstick in battle. Her reasoning was that she was fighting for the right to be herself. She first served as a nurse. During the Huk Rebellion only 10% of soldiers were female. However, after a few months, Liwayway was promoted to commander of her military squad.

During the Battle of Kamansi, the rebel forces was ordered to retreat. Liwayway and her squad refused to do so. Liwayway's group fought off the Japanese although heavily outnumbered. As outcome, the Japanese were forced into a retreat. After the battle, Liwayway's fame spread to other provinces.

After the Americans returned to the Philippines in 1944, the Huks assisted Allied forces' efforts in Luzon. Toward the end of the war, Liwayway tracked down the Japanese officer who killed her father. She inflicted the same punishment on him that he had done to her father.

Liwayway did not accept the victory over the Japanese as the end of the struggle. She again joined the Huks in struggling against the new Philippine democracy which she considered a “farce.”  She was arrested and charged with rebellion but was later released and joined her husband, Bani Paraiso as part of the expansion force in Visayas in 1948.  In a raid later that year, Bani was killed and Liwayway was captured. Though she was eventually acquitted, her career as a revolutionary military commander ended here.

Later life 
With a son to raise, Liwayway laid down her arms and went to work in a market.

Liwayway fought for Filipino resistance fighters' recognition as World War II veterans. Moreover, she lobbied for military pensions and became vocal about the contribution of Filipino women in the war.

Death
In 2014, she died at the age of 95 due to cardiopulmonary arrest.

In popular culture
Liwayway was posthumously featured on a documentary magazine program "History Presents: Mga Babae Sa Rebolusyon" in 2014.

In 2021, her story was depicted in the 2021 short film "Beauty Queen."

References 

1910s births
2014 deaths
Filipino military leaders
 Kapampangan people
Women soldiers